Severo M. Ornstein (born 1930) is a retired computer scientist and son of American composer Leo Ornstein. In 1955 he joined MIT's Lincoln Laboratory as a programmer and designer for the SAGE air-defense system. He later joined the TX-2 group and became a member of the team that designed the LINC. He moved with the team to Washington University in St. Louis where he was one of the principal designers of macromodules.

Returning to Boston he joined Bolt, Beranek and Newman. When ARPA issued a Request for Proposal for the ARPANET, he joined the group that wrote the winning proposal. He was responsible for the design of the communication interfaces and other special hardware for the Interface Message Processor. In 1972 he headed the first delegation of U.S. computer scientists to the People's Republic of China.

In 1976, he joined Xerox PARC where he implemented a computer interface to an early laser printer. Later he co-led (with Ed McCreight) the team that built the Dorado computer.
Ornstein co-designed Mockingbird, the first interactive computer-based music-score editor, and oversaw its programming.

In 1980 he was instrumental in starting Computer Professionals for Social Responsibility (CPSR). He wrote an autobiography describing his experiences in computer science, published in 2002.

References

Oral history interview with Severo Ornstein, Charles Babbage Institute, University of Minnesota.  Ornstein describes his experience at Lincoln Laboratory which included work on the SAGE, TX-2 and LINC computers. He discusses his move to Washington University, and the later work there on DARPA/IPTO sponsored macromodule project. As the principal hardware designer of the Interface Message Processor (IMP) for the ARPANET, Ornstein describes the IMP design work at Bolt Beranek and Newman (BBN), the working environment of the group at BBN, his relationship with Lawrence Roberts, his interactions with Honeywell, and his work on the Pluribus multi-processor IMP. Ornstein also discusses the contributions of Wesley Clark and Norman Abramson, his involvement with the Computer Professionals for Social Responsibility, and his views on artificial intelligence and time-sharing.
Oral history interview with Severo Ornstein and Laura Gould, Charles Babbage Institute, University of Minnesota.  Oral history interview by Bruce Bruemmer, 17 November 1994, Woodside, California, discussing the formation and activities of Computer Professionals for Social Responsibility.
A Brief History of ARPANET, mentioning Ornstein
Severo's website on the composer Leo Ornstein, his father

American computer scientists
Computer systems researchers
Living people
American people of Russian-Jewish descent
Scientists at PARC (company)
MIT Lincoln Laboratory people
1930 births
Washington University in St. Louis people